Paul Boyd may refer to:

 Paul Boyd (director), Scottish music video, commercial and feature film director
 Paul Boyd (journalist) (born 1976), American-based Canadian television journalist
 Paul Boyd (animator) (1967–2007), Canadian animator who worked on the Ed, Edd n Eddy title sequence, shot and killed in August 2007